Neuadd Trefawr (sometimes misspelt Noyadd Trefawr) is a small village in the  community of Beulah, Ceredigion, Wales, which is 71.9 miles (115.8 km) from Cardiff and 192.8 miles (310.3 km) from London. Neuadd Trefawr is represented in the Senedd by Elin Jones (Plaid Cymru) and is part of the Ceredigion constituency in the House of Commons.

Noyadd Trefawr is also the name of a Grade II* listed house in the community, which following major refurbishment in April 2017 has been operating as a Guest House.

References

See also
List of localities in Wales by population

Villages in Ceredigion